Stadium–Ithan Avenue station, formerly known as Stadium station, is a SEPTA rapid transit station in Radnor Township, Pennsylvania. It serves the Norristown High Speed Line (Route 100) and is located on Ithan Avenue near Lancaster Avenue (US 30), near Villanova Stadium, the athletic facility for nearby Villanova University. Local, Hughes Park Express, and Norristown Express trains stop at Ithan Avenue.

Station layout

External links

 Ithan Avenue entrance from Google Maps Street View

SEPTA Norristown High Speed Line stations
Radnor Township, Delaware County, Pennsylvania